Feliz Edgar Neto Vaz (born 9 April 1989 in Vizela, Braga District), known simply as Feliz, is a Portuguese professional footballer who plays for F.C. Penafiel as a forward.

References

External links

1989 births
Living people
People from Vizela
Sportspeople from Braga District
Portuguese footballers
Association football forwards
Primeira Liga players
Liga Portugal 2 players
Segunda Divisão players
G.D. Serzedelo players
G.D. Ribeirão players
Rio Ave F.C. players
C.D. Trofense players
F.C. Famalicão players
C.D. Feirense players
F.C. Penafiel players
Portugal youth international footballers